Protitame virginalis, the virgin moth, is a moth in the family Geometridae. The species was first described by George Duryea Hulst in 1900. It is found in North America.

The MONA or Hodges number for Protitame virginalis is 6270.

References

Further reading

External links

 

Ennominae
Articles created by Qbugbot
Moths described in 1900